Richard James “Rick” Cosnett (born 6 April 1983) is a Zimbabwean-Australian actor and producer. He is known for playing the roles of Wes Maxfield in The Vampire Diaries, Elias Harper in Quantico and Eddie Thawne in The Flash.

Early life and education
Cosnett was born on 6 April 1983 and was raised on a farm in Chegutu, Zimbabwe. His family took part in community musical theater there, which made him interested in acting from an early age. When he was seventeen, his family decided to move to Queensland, Australia, in large part due to land reforms in Zimbabwe.

Cosnett attended the Queensland University of Technology in Brisbane. He originally received a scholarship to study music but graduated with a Bachelors of Fine Arts in Acting.

Personal life
Cosnett is a cousin of Hugh Grant. On 13 February 2020, Cosnett publicly came out as gay on his Instagram account.

Filmography

Film

Television

As producer

References

External links
 
 
 

1983 births
21st-century Australian male actors
Alumni of Peterhouse Boys' School
Australian actors of African descent
Australian emigrants to the United States
Australian male film actors
Australian male stage actors
Australian male television actors
Australian people of Zimbabwean descent
Australian gay actors
Zimbabwean LGBT people
Living people
Queensland University of Technology alumni
White Zimbabwean people
Zimbabwean emigrants to Australia